Uusimaa is a morning broadsheet newspaper published in Finland. It is based in Porvoo. The circulation of the paper was 10,767 copies in 2013.

References

External links
Official site

Daily newspapers published in Finland
Finnish-language newspapers
Mass media in Porvoo